Ana Paola Andía Rivero (born 10 June 1999) is a Bolivian footballer who plays as a midfielder for the Bolivia women's national team.

Early life
Andía hails from the Santa Cruz Department.

International career
Andía represented Bolivia at the 2018 South American U-20 Women's Championship. At senior level, she played the 2018 Copa América Femenina.

References

1999 births
Living people
Women's association football midfielders
Bolivian women's footballers
People from Santa Cruz Department (Bolivia)
Bolivia women's international footballers